Professor Hugo de Burgh (born 10 June 1949) is Director of the China Media Centre at the University of Westminster, which he founded in January 2005. Before that, he ran the Centre for Media Research at Goldsmiths College. de Burgh is founder, and Honorary Chairman of, Europe's first dual-language English Chinese School, Kensington Wade. He is State Administration of Foreign Experts Affairs Endowment Professor at Tsinghua University, honorary fellow at the 48 Group Club, and board member at the Great Britain–China Centre.

Background
Professor de Burgh started in academic life teaching history at Edinburgh University before working as an education correspondent and television producer for STV, BBC and Channel 4. In 2004, he joined the University of Westminster as a professor of journalism, where he set up the China Media Centre. His expertise ranges through international media, investigative journalism, and China's culture industries and policy.

Thesis
His original focus was the social function of journalism as a reflection of culture. He has said "It is often said that journalism is the first rough draft of history; by contrast, investigative journalism provides the first rough draft of legislation..."

More recently, in 2020 in China’s Media in the Emerging World Order, he argued that "the way the Chinese media work can be understood as a reflection of culture as much as of political economy."

His 2003 book 'The Chinese Journalist: mediating information in the world's most populous country' exposed the cognitive dissonance of Chinese media workers unable to realise their own expectations of their work. It also demonstrated that, far from seeing themselves as Westernizing, media workers were looking to past Chinese experience for inspiration and drawing upon their perceptions of Chinese culture as well as upon the tools of expression provided by the internet.

Chinese journalism

Of special interest is the reappearance of investigative journalism in China since 1992. He said this showed that the supposedly western techniques of investigative journalism apply in contrasting political cultures.

It was a surprise to Western observers to find that the Chinese media (and investigative journalists in particular) are, despite limitations upon them, influencing public life today by introducing new and unconventional ideas, changing terms of reference, forcing the pace of reform, giving voice to concerns and calling attention to issues.

Further reading 

China’s Media in the Emerging World Order, Hugo de Burgh, Milton Keynes: UBP, 2020. [2nd Edition]
China’s Media Go Global, Hugo de Burgh co-ed with Thussu, Daya and Shi Anbin], London: Routledge, 2018.
China’s Media in the Emerging World Order, Hugo de Burgh, Milton Keynes: UBP, 2017. [1st Edition]
China’s Environment and China’s Environment Journalists, Hugo de Burgh co-ed with Zeng Rong, London: Intellect, 2011.
Investigative Journalism: Context and Practice, Hugo de Burgh ed, London and New York: Routledge, 2008. [2nd Edition]
Can the Prizes still Glitter? The future of British universities in a changing world, Hugo de Burgh co-ed with Fazackerley, Anna and Black, Jeremy, Milton Keynes: UBP, 2007.
China: Friend or Foe? , Hugo de Burgh, Cambridge: Icon, 2006.
Making Journalists: Diverse Models, Global Issues, Hugo de Burgh, London: Routledge, 2005.
The Chinese Journalist: Mediating information in the world’s most populous country, Hugo de Burgh, London: Routledge, 2003.
Investigative Journalism: Context and Practice, Hugo de Burgh ed, London and New York: Routledge, 2000. [1st Edition]
Tiger Hunting by Hugo de Burgh

References

1949 births
Living people
British male journalists
Academics of the University of Westminster
British mass media scholars
Academics of Goldsmiths, University of London
Press TV people